The 2011–12 Scottish Cup was the 127th season of Scotland's most prestigious football knockout competition. The tournament began on 24 September 2011 and ended on 19 May 2012. It was sponsored by William Hill in the first season of a three-year partnership, known as the William Hill Scottish Cup. The winner of the competition qualified for the play-off round of the 2012–13 UEFA Europa League. Heart of Midlothian won 5–1 against city rivals Hibernian at Hampden Park.

Calendar

Fixtures & Results

First round
The first round draw was conducted on 29 August 2011 at Buchanan Galleries in Glasgow.

This round is populated entirely by non-league clubs:
 13 clubs from the Highland Football League holding membership of the SFA (Brora Rangers, Clachnacuddin, Cove Rangers, Forres Mechanics, Fort William, Fraserburgh, Huntly, Inverurie Loco Works, Keith, Lossiemouth, Nairn County, Rothes, Wick Academy) 
 10 clubs from the East of Scotland League holding membership of the SFA (Civil Service Strollers, Coldstream, Edinburgh City, Edinburgh University, Gala Fairydean, Hawick Royal Albert, Preston Athletic, Selkirk, Vale of Leithen, Whitehill Welfare)
 4 clubs from the South of Scotland League holding membership of the SFA (Dalbeattie Star, Newton Stewart, St Cuthbert Wanderers, Wigtown & Bladnoch)
 4 other clubs holding membership of the SFA (Burntisland Shipyard, Girvan, Glasgow University, Golspie Sutherland)
 4 qualifiers from the Scottish Junior Football Association (Auchinleck Talbot, Bo'ness United, Culter, Irvine Meadow)

Golspie Sutherland received a bye into the Second Round.

Source:

First round replay

Source:

Second round
The second round draw was conducted on 28 September 2011 at the William Hill shop in West Campbell Street in Glasgow.

The 17 winners and 1 bye from the First Round enter here, along with the 10 SFL Third Division clubs (Alloa Athletic, Annan Athletic, Berwick Rangers, Clyde, East Stirlingshire, Elgin City, Montrose, Peterhead, Queen's Park, Stranraer), Highland League champions (Buckie Thistle), Highland League runners-up (Deveronvale), East of Scotland League champions (Spartans) and South of Scotland League champions (Threave Rovers).

At a hearing of the SFA Judicial Panel on 10 November 2011, Spartans were expelled from the competition for fielding an unregistered and therefore ineligible player in their Second Round tie against Culter. Culter were re-instated to the Third round.

Source: BBC† Spartans expelled for fielding an ineligible player. Culter progress to the Third Round.

Second round replays

Source: BBC Sport

Third round
The Third Round draw was conducted on 26 October 2011 at Musselburgh Racecourse.

The 16 winners from the Second Round enter here, along with the 10 SFL Second Division clubs (Airdrie United, Albion Rovers, Arbroath, Brechin City, Cowdenbeath, Dumbarton, East Fife, Forfar Athletic, Stenhosemuir, Stirling Albion) and 6 SFL First Division clubs (Ayr United, Dundee, Greenock Morton, Livingston, Partick Thistle, Ross County)

Source: BBC Sport

Third round replays

Source: BBC Sport

Fourth round
The fourth round draw was conducted on 22 November 2011 at 10:30am at Hampden Park live on Sky Sports News.

The 16 winners from the third round entered here, along with the 12 SPL clubs (Aberdeen, Celtic, Dundee United, Dunfermline Athletic, Heart of Midlothian, Hibernian, Inverness Caledonian Thistle, Kilmarnock, Motherwell, Rangers, St Johnstone, St Mirren) and four SFL First Division clubs who were exempt from playing in the third round (Falkirk, Hamilton Academical, Queen of the South, Raith Rovers).

Source: BBC Sport

Fourth round replays

Source: BBC Sport

Fifth round
The fifth round draw was conducted on 9 January 2012 at 2:30pm at Hampden Park live on Sky Sports News.

The 16 winners from the fourth round entered here.

Source: BBC Sport

Fifth round replays

Source: BBC Sport

Quarter-finals
The Quarter-finals draw was conducted on 6 February 2012 at 2:30pm at Hampden Park live on Sky Sports News.

Source: BBC Sport

Quarter-final replay

Source: BBC Sport

Semi-finals
The Semi-final draw was conducted on 11 March 2012 at Fir Park live on Sky Sports 3 & Sky Sports 3 HD following the Motherwell vs Aberdeen tie.

Source: BBC Sport

Final

Source: BBC Sport

Awards
The Scottish Cup Player of the Round was decided by the fans, who cast their vote to choose a winner from a list of nominations on the official Scottish Cup Facebook page.

Media coverage
From round four onwards, selected matches from the Scottish Cup are broadcast live in Ireland and the UK by BBC Scotland and Sky Sports. BBC Scotland has the option to show one tie per round with Sky Sports showing two ties per round with one replay also. Both channels will screen the final live.

These matches were broadcast live on television.

Overseas
From round 4 onwards, Premium Sports showed matches live in the USA and Caribbean. Setanta Sports Australia show matches live in Australia.

References

External links
 Official site 
 2011–12 Scottish Cup at ESPN
 2011–12 Scottish Cup Coverage at the Guardian

Scottish Cup seasons
1
Scottish Cup